A Murder of Crows is a 1998 American psychological thriller film directed and written by Rowdy Herrington and starring Cuba Gooding Jr. and Tom Berenger. It was released in the UK on 12 December 1998, and in the USA on 6 July 1999.

Plot

Lawson Russell narrates his story from prison. He is a New Orleans criminal defense lawyer who has had a crisis of conscience while defending wealthy childhood friend Thurman Parks III. Parks denies charges of the rape and murder of a stripper. Russell is involved with Parks' and Judge Wiley Banning's conspiracy to have the charges dismissed. Russell, however, knowing Thurman is guilty, attempts to recuse himself from the case. Judge Banning refuses to accept Russell's recusal and threatens to end his career. Russell enters court and accuses Parks, resulting in a mistrial. Judge Banning has Russell disbarred for life.

Thirteen months later, Russell has retired to Key West as a fishing guide and decides to write a book about his experience. He suffers from perpetual writer's block. He befriends Marlowe, an elderly former teacher and recent widower who asks him to read his manuscript. Attempting to return the manuscript, Russell encounters detective Goethe, who informs Russell that Marlowe has died leaving no next of kin. Russell decides to pass the book off as his own. It becomes a huge success, giving Russell fame and a luxurious lifestyle. Russell begins a sexual relationship with his book's publisher, Janine.

Detective Clifford Dubose receives a copy of Russell's book from an anonymous sender and realizes that the murders in the book are identical to the real-life deaths of five attorneys that were written off as accidents or suicides. Russell is arrested and charged with the murder of the attorneys. He hires his former colleague Elizabeth Pope to defend him and tells her about Marlowe and the manuscript. She doesn't believe him and drops him as a client. Dubose searches Russell's home and finds hidden pictures of all the dead attorneys. Russell realizes he is being framed and goes on the run.

Russell follows a clue to the home of Thurman Parks III and breaks in to investigate. He discovers that Parks is seeing Janine. Another clue leads him to the home of Professor Arthur Corvus, where he discovers a room full of costumes and prosthetic face masks. Russell realizes that Marlowe, Goethe, and even a random fan at his book signing were all actually Corvus. He concludes that Corvus murdered the lawyers. Corvus's housekeeper discovers Russell and calls the police. Dubose arrives and questions Corvus, who denies ever meeting or knowing Russell. Dubose is suspicious. Russell digs into Corvus's background and discovers that three years earlier, Corvus's wife and daughter had been killed in a hit-and-run accident by a banker, whose lawyer, Jeffery Lowell, got him off on a technicality. Russell returns to Corvus's home and confronts him. Corvus, armed, takes Russell's gun and admits to killing Lowell and the other attorneys for misuse of the justice system. He also says that he was going to kill Russell the night he attempted to recuse himself. Corvus became intrigued by Russell's struggling conscience and decided to test him. Overhearing Corvus's confession, Dubose interrupts and takes Corvus's gun. As Dubose calls for backup, Corvus kills Dubose with Russell's gun. Russell wrestles Corvus for both guns. Realizing that the police and courts would not believe that Corvus was the real murderer, Russell having both guns uses one to kill Corvus as the police arrive.

The movie cuts back to the beginning scene with Russell in prison. Pope visits Russell to discuss his court strategy and hires a well-known attorney for him. Russell is found not guilty on all charges. In a voice-over, Russell states that the publicity of the case resulted in the skyrocketing of sales for the novel, making him a millionaire. The movie ends with Russell alone at the beach, contemplating justice.

Cast
 Cuba Gooding Jr. as Lawson Russell
 Tom Berenger as Detective Clifford Dubose
 Marianne Jean-Baptiste as Elizabeth Pope
 Eric Stoltz as Thurman Parks III
 Mark Pellegrino as Professor Arthur Corvus
 Ashley Laurence as Janine DeVrie
 Carmen Argenziano as Judge Wiley Banning
 Lochlyn Munro as Norwood
 Doug Wert as Billy Ray Richardson

Production
Filming began in December 1997, across Key West, Florida, Los Angeles, California, and New Orleans, Louisiana. It has been released on DVD.

References

External links

1998 films
1998 independent films
1990s American films
1990s English-language films
1990s psychological thriller films
American independent films
American psychological thriller films
Films about writers
Films directed by Rowdy Herrington
Films produced by Elie Samaha
Films scored by Steve Porcaro
Films shot in Florida
Films shot in Los Angeles
Films shot in New Orleans
Franchise Pictures films